José Martínez (born May 7, 1973) is a Mexican sprint canoer who competed in the early 1990s. At the 1992 Summer Olympics in Barcelona, he was eliminated in the semifinals of both the C-1 1000 m and C-2 500 m events.

References

1973 births
Canoeists at the 1992 Summer Olympics
Living people
Mexican male canoeists
Olympic canoeists of Mexico
20th-century Mexican people